Teddy Chan Tak-sum (born 26 April 1958) is a Hong Kong film director, producer, writer and actor.

Filmography
Filmography as director, art director and other positions:

 Man on the Brink  邊緣人 (1981), assistant director
 Twinkle Twinkle Little Star  星際鈍胎 (1983), assistant director
 The Red Panther 害時出世 (1983), assistant director
 The Family Strikes Back 烏龍大家庭 (1986), actor
 The Legend of Wisely 衛斯理傳奇 (1987), assistant director
 Gunmen 天羅地網 (1988), assistant director
 Pretty Ghost 我老婆不是人 (1991), director
 Fight Back to School 逃學威龍 (1991), actor
 The Magic Touch (film) 神算 (1992), actor
 Lover's Tear 誓不忘情 (1992), actor
 Gameboy Kids 機Boy小子之真假威龍 (1992), actor
 Cageman 籠民 (1992), actor
 Arrest the Restless 藍江傳之反飛組風雲 (1992), actor
 Two of a Kind 情人知己 (1993), director
 Tom, Dick And Hairy 風塵三俠 (1993), actor
 Murder 黃蜂尾後針 (1993), actor
 Emotional Girl - Doubt of Distress 那個少女不多情之脫的疑惑 (1993), actor
 C'est la vie, mon chéri 新不了情 (1993), actor
 Twenty Something 晚九朝五 (1994), director
 The True Hero 暴雨驕陽 (1994), brief appearance
 In the Heat of Summer 點指兵兵之青年干探 (1994), director, producer, production manager
 Hello ! Who Is It ? 喂，搵邊位？ (1994), actor
 Chuang Zha Ma Mi a.k.a. The Meaning of Life 搶閘媽咪 (1995), actor
 Full Throttle 烈火戰車 (1995), producer
 Viva Erotica 色情男女 (1996), brief appearance
 Lost and Found 天涯海角 (1996), brief appearance
 The Log 三個受傷的警察 (1996), writer
 Hong Kong Showgirls 鬼劇院之驚青艷女郎 (1996), actor
 Black Mask 黑俠 (1996), writer
 Ah Kam 阿金 (1996), actor
 Downtown Torpedoes 神偷諜影 (1997), director
 A True Mob Story 龍在江湖 (1998), actor
 Purple Storm 紫雨風暴 (1999), director, original story
 The Accidental Spy 特務迷城 (2001), director
 1:99 Shorts  1:99 電影行動 (segment: "Always Look on the Bright Side") (2003), director, writer
 Project 1:99 (2003), director
 Infernal Affairs II (2003), actor
 Hidden Track 尋找周杰倫 (2003), producer
 Wait 'Til You're Older 童夢奇緣 (2005), director, producer
 Chaos 三不管 (2008), producer
 Bodyguards and Assassins 十月圍城 (2009), director
 Kung Fu Jungle 一个人的武林 (2014), director
 Double World 征途 (2020), director

References

External links
 

1958 births
Hong Kong film directors
Living people